The Samyang 10mm 1:2.8 ED AS NCS CS is an interchangeable camera lens announced by Samyang on December 6, 2013.

References

http://www.dpreview.com/products/samyang/lenses/samyang_10_2p8/specifications

Camera lenses introduced in 2013
010